Crestomere is an unincorporated community in central Alberta in Ponoka County, located on Highway 53,  north of Red Deer.

Localities in Ponoka County